Breast binding, also known as chest binding, is the flattening of breasts with constrictive materials such as cloth strips, purpose-built undergarments, often using spandex or other synthetic fiber, and shirts layered from tight to loose. Binders may also be used as alternatives to bras or for reasons of propriety.

People who bind include females, trans men, and non-binary persons.

History
Breast binding has been used in many historical contexts. Different time periods of history have had differing viewpoints on the female form, including the widespread use of corsets throughout western European history up to the Victorian era.

During the era of China's imperial dynasties, revealing the curves of a woman's breast was considered lewd and breasts were often bound with a moxiong. The use of the garment was particularly popular during the Tang and Song dynasties. Breast binding became an exclusive aesthetic practice for women continuing until the 1930s, with more prevalence among upper-class women.  

In Japan, the traditional kimono flattens the appearance of the breasts, with breasts bound and flattened with an obi, and a datemaki belt wrapped around the torso from the chest to the waist.  A sarashi is used by Japanese women to flatten their breasts.

Korean women wearing the traditional hanbok concealed the female body by binding their breasts tightly with a cloth band.

In Africa, adolescent Wodaabe girls had their breasts tightly bound to induce sagging, minimize sexual desirability, and improve their ability to breastfeed. In cultures where the breasts of pubescent girls are ironed to suppress their development, wealthier classes often choose to use an elastic belt to compress and flatten the breasts.

Until the early 20th century, many Catholic nuns bound their breasts under their habit to deflect the attention of male clergy and diminish sexual desire in men.

Breast binding was one of the punishments inflicted upon the women inmates confined in Ireland's Magdalene asylums.

Post-WWI women office workers modified their physique with bound breasts to reduce and conceal the female form, thereby minimizing sexual curiosity from males.

In the 1920s, a flat-chested silhouette became the ideal look among women, with breasts bound against the chest wall with binders. To present a boyish form, flappers bound their breasts.

Wearing a corset was one way that the size of breasts could be reduced.

Motivation

There are many reasons people would bind their breasts:
 For accelerated recovery by reducing movement after an injury or surgery.
 For lactation suppression.
 For concealment of breasts or breast development.
 For beauty and aesthetics.
 For cosplay, crossplay, and other forms of costuming.
 For a masculine clothed appearance, to assist with passing as male.
 For transgender men, including non-binary people, it alleviates gender dysphoria by altering the appearance of the chest and creates gender euphoria; and as a substitute for, or prior to chest masculinization surgery.

Women who have developed larger breasts from hormone replacement therapy or breast augmentation surgery may choose to bind.

Some adolescents begin to bind their breasts as they enter puberty. This is usually done because of embarrassment (they do not want others to know they have started developing), or desire to be as they previously were (they do not want to have breasts yet).  This has potential risks, as the developing tissue may conform to the restricted shape, resulting in permanent deformity. Breast binding in adolescent girls may be a symptom of body dysmorphic disorder.

Transgender and non-binary people
Transgender men may bind their breasts as an alternative to or while waiting for top surgery in order to be recognized as masculine presenting. The appearance of a flat, masculine chest may cause gender euphoria.

Many people who bind for gender-affirming purposes are unwilling to seek medical attention due to a perceived lack of knowledge from healthcare professionals and continue binding since they believe the benefits outweigh the risks.  In case of health concerns, they tend to seek help from healthcare professionals they perceive as trans-friendly and who will not stigmatize their binding practice.

Gynecomastia
Cisgender men afflicted with gynecomastia may find cause to bind as a means to control the appearance of enlarged breasts, during the wait before surgery or as an alternative to surgery. However, cisgender men with gynecomastia may often wear male bras.

Methods
Purpose-built undergarments known as binders or binding bras exist (often using spandex or other synthetic fibre), and are commonly used for breast binding. These can be more expensive than other options and are not widely stocked, but they are generally considered less dangerous than alternatives.

Other common binding materials include cloth strips, elastic or non-elastic bandages, and shirts layered from tight to loose. Duct tape has been used as well, but is dangerous and should be avoided. Elastic bandages such as ace bandages are also unsafe to use. It is safest to use a binder from a reputable company or a high impact sports bra.

Complications
Breast binding is known to create a number of health risks, including difficulty breathing, backache, skin rashes, and deformity of the ribs.

To minimise complications, some limit their binding use for no longer than eight hours. Binding for extended periods of time can lead to rashes or yeast infections under the breasts, back or chest pain, shortness of breath, overheating, or, rarely, fractured ribs. Additionally, some unconventional binding materials, such as duct tape or athletic bandages, are known to increase an individual's risk for negative health outcomes such as shortness of breath, musculoskeletal damage, and skin damage. Unsafe binding may lead to permanent deformation of the breasts, scarring, and lung constriction, and long-term binding may adversely affect the outcome of a future mastectomy.

See also
 Breast reduction
 Dudou

References

Further reading

External links

Breast
Body modification
Human appearance
Undergarments
Sexuality and society
Trans men
Flappers